Neocentema is a genus of flowering plants belonging to the family Amaranthaceae.

Its native range is Somalia, Tanzania.

Species:

Neocentema alternifolia 
Neocentema robecchii

References

Amaranthaceae
Amaranthaceae genera